Alexandre Jansen Da Silva (born 16 January 1987) is a Belgian professional footballer who currently plays for Renaissance Mons 44.

Career
Jansen Da Silva and his 1-year younger brother Alandson were born in West Flanders to Brazilian parents. Their father Sérgio da Silva played in the late 1980s for KSV Waregem and KRC Harelbeke. Alexandre made his debut at the highest level of Belgian football as a replacement for Brian Priske at Club Brugge. He played his first match for Standard against FCV Dender one day after his 22nd birthday, when he achieved a spot in the starting eleven. He is usually fielded at right full back.

References

External links
Alexandre Jansen Da Silva at Footballdatabase

1987 births
Living people
Belgian footballers
Belgian expatriate footballers
Association football defenders
S.V. Zulte Waregem players
Club Brugge KV players
Standard Liège players
A.F.C. Tubize players
KFC Turnhout players
Royal Cappellen F.C. players
Nõmme Kalju FC players
Sportkring Sint-Niklaas players
R.A.E.C. Mons players
Belgian Pro League players
Challenger Pro League players
Esiliiga players
Meistriliiga players
People from Waregem
Belgian people of Brazilian descent
Expatriate footballers in Estonia
KFC Houtvenne players
Footballers from West Flanders
Belgian expatriate sportspeople in Estonia